Nimbus Mono is a monospaced typeface created by URW Studio in 1984, and eventually released under the GPL and AFPL (as Type 1 font for Ghostscript) in 1996 and LPPL in 2009. In 2017, the font, alongside other Core 35 fonts, has been additionally licensed under the terms of OFL.  It features Normal, Bold, Italic, and Bold Italic weights, and is one of several freely licensed fonts offered by URW++. Although not exactly the same, Nimbus Mono has metrics and glyphs that are very similar to Courier and Courier New. 

It is one of the Ghostscript fonts, free alternatives to 35 basic PostScript fonts (which include Courier). It is a standard typeface in many Linux distributions.

External links
Tex Gyre Cursor is a derivative of Nimbus Mono L with additional glyphs.

See also
Nimbus Sans L
Nimbus Roman No9 L
Free software Unicode typefaces

References

External links
Nimbus Mono L - commercial version
Nimbus Mono L on MyFonts
Ghostscript Git - URW fonts (Type 1, OTF and TTF)
Ghostscript changelog (includes changes in Ghostscript Nimbus fonts)
Fonts and font facilities supplied with Ghostscript

Monospaced typefaces
Open-source typefaces
Typefaces and fonts introduced in 1984
Slab serif typefaces